Andrew Whitfield (17 October 1971 – 11 September 2011) was a Welsh actor. He was best known for his leading role in the Starz television series Spartacus: Blood and Sand.

Early life and career
Whitfield and his family came to live in Bull Bay, Anglesey, Wales in 1976. He attended Ysgol Gynradd Amlwch and then Ysgol Syr Thomas Jones until the age of 18. He studied civil engineering at Sheffield Hallam University in England. He moved to Australia in 1999 to work as an engineer in Lidcombe, before later settling in Sydney. He appeared in several Australian television series, such as Opening Up, All Saints, The Strip, Packed to the Rafters, and McLeod's Daughters.

Whitfield gained his first prominent role in the Australian supernatural film Gabriel. He also starred in the 2010 television series Spartacus: Blood and Sand, which was filmed in New Zealand. Whitfield also appeared in the Australian thriller The Clinic starring opposite Tabrett Bethell (of Legend of the Seeker fame) which was shot in Deniliquin.

In August 2010, Whitfield teamed up with Freddie Wong and created a 2-minute YouTube video named "Time Crisis", based on the video game series of the same name.  Whitfield made a brief, uncredited voice-only appearance in the prequel mini-series Spartacus: Gods of the Arena, which premiered on 21 January 2011.

A documentary titled Be Here Now premiered at the 2015 Los Angeles Film Festival. It follows the journey and struggle of Whitfield and his family as he undergoes chemotherapy treatment for non-Hodgkin Lymphoma. It was later released on Netflix as Be Here Now: The Andy Whitfield Story.

Personal life
Whitfield married documentary maker Vashti Whitfield in 2001. They had two children, Jesse Red and Indigo Sky.

Illness and death
In March 2010, Whitfield was diagnosed with stage IV non-Hodgkin lymphoma and began undergoing treatment immediately in New Zealand. This delayed production of season two of Spartacus: Vengeance. While waiting for Whitfield's treatment and expected recovery, Starz produced a six-part prequel, Spartacus: Gods of the Arena, with only a brief uncredited voiceover from the actor. Although declared cancer-free in June 2010, a routine medical check in September 2010 revealed a relapse and Whitfield was compelled to abandon the role. Starz recast Australian actor Liam McIntyre as Whitfield's successor.

Whitfield died of non-Hodgkin lymphoma in Sydney, New South Wales, Australia, on 11 September 2011, 18 months after his initial cancer diagnosis.

Filmography

References

External links
 

1971 births
2011 deaths
Welsh male film actors
Welsh male television actors
21st-century Welsh male actors
Alumni of Sheffield Hallam University
Deaths from cancer in New South Wales
Deaths from non-Hodgkin lymphoma
People from Amlwch
Welsh expatriates in Australia
Actors from Anglesey